"Gimme, Gimme, Gimme" is a 1985 song performed by Narada Michael Walden and Patti Austin. Not wildly successful in US or the UK, it was a big hit in Sweden and Norway in 1985.

Charts

Weekly charts

Year-end charts

References

1985 singles
1985 songs
Patti Austin songs
Songs written by Jeffrey E. Cohen
Songs written by Preston Glass
Songs written by Narada Michael Walden
Warner Records singles